The 2013 Tennessee Volunteers football team represented the University of Tennessee in the 2013 NCAA Division I FBS football season. The Volunteers played their home games at Neyland Stadium in Knoxville, Tennessee and competes in the Eastern Division of the Southeastern Conference (SEC). The team was coached by Butch Jones, who was in his inaugural season with UT. Jones was hired on December 7, 2012 to replace Derek Dooley who was fired on November 18, 2012 after an embarrassing loss to Vanderbilt. On August 31, 2013, UT earned its 800th victory in program history against Austin Peay and became only the eighth school in the nation to reach that plateau after Michigan, Texas, Notre Dame, Nebraska, Ohio State, Oklahoma, and Alabama.

Coaching staff

Schedule

Rankings

Team players drafted into the NFL

Reference:

References

Tennessee
Tennessee Volunteers football seasons
Tennessee Volunteers football